"Stand by Your Man" is a song recorded by American country music artist Tammy Wynette, co-written by Wynette and Billy Sherrill. It was released on September 20, 1968, as the first single and title track from the album Stand by Your Man. It proved to be the most successful record of Wynette's career, and is one of the most familiar songs in the history of country music. The song was placed at number one on CMT's list of the Top 100 Country Music Songs.

Released as a single, it stayed number one on the U.S. country charts for three weeks. "Stand by Your Man" crossed over to the U.S. pop charts, peaking at number nineteen. It elevated Wynette—then one of many somewhat successful female country recording artists—to superstar status. It reached number one in the UK Singles Chart when the record was released in the United Kingdom in 1975, and also reached number one in the Netherlands. An album of the same name—which was also quite successful—was released in 1968. The song earned Wynette the 1970 Grammy Award for Best Country Vocal Performance, Female—her second Grammy win in that category—and was inducted into the Grammy Hall of Fame in 1999.

Vocal accompaniment is provided by The Jordanaires, who provided background vocals on most of Wynette's hit recordings.
 
The song was selected by the Library of Congress as a 2010 addition to the National Recording Registry, which selects recordings annually that are "culturally, historically, or aesthetically significant". In 2021, it was ranked No. 473 on Rolling Stone's "Top 500 Songs of All Time".

Background and writing

"Stand by Your Man" was reportedly written in 1968 at Columbia Recording Studios in Nashville in all of 15 minutes. The song came from an idea that originated with Wynette's producer, Billy Sherrill, who along with Wynette is one of the two writers credited. Tammy was not very fond of the song at first because it was unlike anything she had ever written before, and because there is a high note that was hard for her to sing. She said that, over time, she got to love the song, and came to the point where she "couldn't do a show without it." Sherrill originally stated that, before "Stand by Your Man" release, he thought that Wynette's "D-I-V-O-R-C-E" would be Wynette's signature song. However, after witnessing how successful the song came to be in America during that time, Sherrill then agreed that "Stand by Your Man" was definitely Wynette's career-defining hit.

Content

Derided by the feminist movement of the late 1960s and early 1970s, Wynette in later years defended the song as not a call for women to place themselves second to men, but rather a suggestion that women attempt to overlook their husbands' shortcomings and faults if they truly love them (and in fact, the last line in the final verse says "after all, he's just a man"). Wynette always defended her signature song. The song remained contentious into the early 1990s, when soon-to-be First Lady Hillary Clinton told CBS' 60 Minutes during the "Gennifer Flowers interview" that she "wasn't some little woman 'standing by my man' like Tammy Wynette."

In popular culture

Answer songs included Conway Twitty's 1971 No. 1 hit "How Much More Can She Stand" and Ronnie Milsap's "(I'm A) Stand by My Woman Man," a 1976 number that also topped the country music charts.

In 2003, "Stand by Your Man" was rated number one on CMT's 100 Greatest Songs in Country Music.  In 2004, "Stand by Your Man" was rated number sixteen on CMT's 100 Greatest Country Love Songs.

Country music star Carrie Underwood performed the song at the Grand Ole Opry in May 2008.

Chart performance

Weekly singles charts

Year-end charts

Certifications

Heike Makatsch version

In 1996, Heike Makatsch recorded her version of the song, which was used as the soundtrack of the movie Jailbirds. The cover was a great success in the German-speaking countries. In terms of musical genre, the cover remained true to the original, but more pop.

Track listings
CD-Maxi
 Stand By Your Man - 2:53
 Cat Calls - Detlef Petersen - 3:37
 Stand By Your Man (Part II mit dem Gefangenenchor) - 3:37

Charts

Hebrew translation
A Hebrew version of the song was written by famed Israeli lyricist Ehud Manor for the 1982 Israeli television show "Red River Valley", which was dedicated to Manor's translations of famous country songs. The Hebrew version, titled "Rak Letzido" (lit. "Only by His Side"), was performed by Riki Gal.

Other cover versions
 In 1968, Patti Page covered the song and released it as an easy listening single, peaking at No. 20.
 In 1970, Candi Staton covered the song, peaking at No. 4 on the Billboard R&B chart and at No. 24 on the pop Hot 100.  She also reached No. 21 on the Cash Box Top 100.
 Dan Aykroyd and John Belushi performed the song in their 1980 film, The Blues Brothers.
 In 1982, Wendy O. Williams of the Plasmatics and Lemmy Kilmister of Motörhead released a duet cover the song.
 In 1989 Lyle Lovett famously covered this song for his album Lyle Lovett and His Large Band.
 In 1994, Lisa Brokop covered the song for the soundtrack to the film Harmony Cats. It was released as a single and peaked at number 88 on the RPM Country Tracks chart.
In 1998, Elton John covered the song for the Tammy Wynette tribute album, Tammy Wynette Remembered.
In 2012, Willam Belli and Drake Jensen covered the song for Belli's debut studio album The Wreckoning. It was released as the ninth single on November 10, 2012.

References

1968 songs
1968 singles
1975 singles
1996 singles
Songs written by Tammy Wynette
Lisa Brokop songs
Lyle Lovett songs
Song recordings produced by Billy Sherrill
UK Singles Chart number-one singles
Irish Singles Chart number-one singles
Tammy Wynette songs
Songs written by Billy Sherrill
United States National Recording Registry recordings
Epic Records singles
Metronome Records singles
The Blues Brothers songs